Royal Noble Consort Won of the Pungsan Hong clan (Hangul: 원빈 풍산 홍씨, Hanja: 元嬪 豊山 洪氏; 27 May 1766 – 7 May 1779) was a concubine of King Jeongjo of Joseon.

Biography

Early life 
Lady Hong was born into the Pungsan Hong clan, on May 27, 1766. She was the second child and only daughter of Hong Nak-chun and his wife, Lady Yi of the Ubong Yi clan. Through her father, Lady Hong is an 11th-degree great-niece of Lady Hyegyeong (mother of King Jeongjo), as well as the 5th great-granddaughter of Hong Joo-won and Princess Jeongmyeong.

Palace Life 
Lady Hong was chosen as a concubine to Jeongjo of Joseon when she was 12 years old, in June 1778. She entered the palace as Royal Noble Consort Won (원빈, 元嬪), alternatively known as Lady Sukchang (숙창궁, 淑昌宮). As a royal consort, it was said that she was treated like a formal consort in Chinese court, receiving morning greetings from the ministers and the physicians, and had posthumous titles conferred to her upon her death. Her older brother, Hong Guk-yeong, was a chief royal secretary who hoped to enhance his power through her marriage with Jeongjo.

However, she soon experienced a phantom pregnancy. Fearing a scandal, she attempted to cover it up, but failed. Out of grief, she died on May 7, 1779.

Legacy 
Jeongjo himself composed a eulogy for her. She was then posthumously honoured as Insuk (인숙; 仁淑) and Lady Hyohwi (효휘궁; 孝徽宮). Her tomb was first located on the present grounds of Korea University, Inmyeongwon (인명원; 仁明園), but was later moved to Seosamreung (서삼릉), Wondang-dong, Goyang-si, Gyeonggi-do, South Korea. In the present, the former site of Inmyeongwon remains on the grounds of Korea University, so it is called 'Aegungun'

After her death, her older brother, Hong Guk-yeong was enraged over the fact that she died unforgiven by Queen Hyoui and her remark that he would have no influence over the next heir. He was ultimately exiled for trying to poison Queen Hyoui out of anger over his sister's death and to prevent his bargain from being exposed, for Queen Hyoui discovered it and threatened to tell King Jeongjo. He aborted the attempt after discovering that the King was taking her place at the food ceremony and tearfully confessed. 

Currently, the Central Research Institute for Korean Studies reports that the handwritten book “Eojeinsukwonbinhaengjang”(어제인숙원빈행장, 御製仁淑元嬪行狀). It is said that it is unusual for the king to write a concubine's coat of arms or eulogy. According to the “Eojeinsukwonbinhaengjang” (어제인숙원빈행장), Lady Hyegyeong showed special affection to Consort Won. This is the direct opposite of the story that Lady Hyegyeong herself wrote in Hanjungnok (한중록, 閑中錄/恨中錄), written after King Jeongjo’s death. In the Annals of Sunjo, there is a section emphasizing that there is an allegation that she and Won-Bin shared a close relationship in supporting one another, but it is said to be not true. The classic novel “The Diary of Lady Sukchang” (숙창궁입궐일기), which seems to have been written by a person from the family line of Hong Guk-yeong, depicts Won-Bin's entrance into the palace, but Lady Hyegyeong gives the impression that she was on the supportive side of Queen Hyoui.

Family 
 Uncle: Hong Nak-sun (홍낙순, 洪樂純) (1723 – ?)
 Aunt: Lady Kim of the Gyeongju Kim clan (경주 김씨)
 Cousin: Hong Bok-yeong (홍복영, 洪福榮)
 Father: Hong Nak-chun (홍낙춘, 洪樂春)
 1) Grandfather: Hong Chang-han (홍창한, 洪昌漢) (1698 – ?)
 2) Great-grandfather: Hong Yang-bo (홍양보, 洪良輔)
 3) Great-great-grandfather: Hong Jong-hae (홍중해, 洪重楷)
 4) Great-great-great-grandfather: Hong Man-hyeong (홍만형, 洪萬衡) (1633 – 1670)
 5) Great-great-great-great-grandfather: Hong Ju-won (홍주원, 洪柱元) (1606 – 3 November 1672)
 5) Great-great-great-great-grandmother: Princess Jeongmyeong (정명공주) (27 June 1603 – 8 September 1685)
 4) Great-great-great-grandmother: Lady Min of the Yeoheung Min clan (여흥 민씨)
 1) Grandmother: Lady Yu (유씨, 兪氏)
 Uncle: Hong Nak-bin (홍낙빈, 洪樂彬) (1732 – ?)
 Cousin: Hong Ik-yeong (홍익영, 洪益榮)
 Mother: Lady Yi of the Ubong Yi clan (우봉 이씨, 牛峰 李氏)
 Sibling(s)
 Older brother: Hong Guk-yeong (홍국영, 洪國榮) (1748 – 28 April 1781)
 Sister-in-law: Lady Yi of the Deoksu Yi clan (덕수 이씨, 德水 李氏)
 Husband: Yi San, King Jeongjo (조선 정조) (28 October 1752 – 18 August 1800)
 Children
 Adoptive son: Yi Dam, Prince Seonggye (상계군 이담) (21 January 1769 – 20 November 1786)
 Adoptive daughter-in-law: Princess Consort Pyeongsan of the Pyeongsan Shin clan (평산군부인 평산 신씨, 平山郡夫人 平山 申氏) (13 June 1770 – 17 March 1801)
 Adoptive grandson: Yi Hui, Prince Ikpyeong (익평군 이희) (16 October 1824 – 18 September 1863)

In popular culture
Portrayed by Lee Ae-jung in the 2001 MBC TV series Hong Guk-yeong.
Portrayed by Ji Sung-won in the 2007 MBC TV series Lee San, Wind of the Palace.
Portrayed by Park Seo-kyung in the 2021 MBC TV series The Red Sleeve.

References

External links
Royal Consort Won on Doosan Encyclopedia .

1766 births
1779 deaths
Royal consorts of the Joseon dynasty
18th-century Korean women
18th-century Korean people